81-717/714 is a metro car designed in the Soviet Union in the mid-1970s. The cars were made from 1976 to 2010 by Metrovagonmash and the I. E. Yegorov Vagonmash factories of Mytishchi and Saint Petersburg, respectively. Production is still ongoing for specific models and/or modernizations.

The name 81-717 and 81-714 come from the Soviet electric rail vehicle numbering system, where the 81-717 cars are the control cars and the 81-714 are the trailer cars. Unlike the previous metro sets made in the Soviet Union, they never received a lettered classification, thus, they have been known as the 81-series or the "Number Trains" (Номерной Поезд). The "number trains", as they are known colloquially among railfans and some commuters, feature restyled front ends, stronger electric traction motors, complex and wider usage of various electronic devices, and are more advanced than their predecessors, the E-series, with the biggest difference being lack of control desks at every end of each car (despite all cars being motorized, though).

They were first deployed in Moscow and Prague in 1978, and have since then seen widespread usage in the former USSR and in Warsaw, Prague, Budapest and Sofia in European Union.

History

Background
By the 1970s, most metro lines in the Soviet Union were using the E-series trainsets, which started mass production in 1963 (although the prototype was built in 1959). They were a further development of the G and D-series sets from the late 1940s and 1950s, but with upgraded electric equipment (contactor-based, built by the Dinamo Electric Machines Factory of Moscow). Although there was improvement in the construction of the carbodies (based on the Riga-built ER1 EMUs of the Soviet Railways), the traction motors were quite weak, and the contactor system had limits. This, in relation to the weight of the cars and the oversimplified electric system, which was built in order to emphasize on energy conservation, led to a poor acceleration performance, which reduced the headway on metro lines on various networks at the time. To counter this, engineers came up with 3 different solutions:
Increase the power of the traction motors
Apply pulse voltage regulation, with excitation of traction motors
Reduce the weight of the carbodies

The pulse voltage regulation system was already attempted. The Ečs subseries of the E-series, which was delivered to Prague from 1972 to 1976, was very different from the Ev subseries delivered to Budapest from 1969 to 1979: it featured thyristor pulse converters to regulate the excitation of traction motors during acceleration and deceleration, increasing their performance, whilst retaining the same carbody. Another upgrade was the Ež3/Em508T subseries, delivered to multiple Soviet cities from 1973 to 1979. Using experiences learnt from the Ei subseries (delivered from 1968 to 1973), it applied pulse voltage regulation on traction motors too, and eliminated the ripple-effects within the ALS-ARS safety systems, greatly improving the general performance of these sets and at the same time, keeping electric consumption to the strictly necessary. In regards to weight reduction, it was still decided to reduce some weight, so the carbodies would be built from aluminium. A more powerful traction engine was developed, too.

Thus, in 1973, at the Mytishchi Machine-Building Plant, a team of engineers under the leadership of the plant's chief designer A. G. Akimov, designed three different prototypes of the new trains, which later became known as the I-series (in the numbered classification, 81-715 was the control car, and 81-716 was the trailer car). The first prototype of the I-series was manufactured in 1974, and it was a drastic change from the other Moscow Metro sets that were using the network at the time: compared to the original E-series, which produced 72 kWh, the new sets produced 90 (later 100) kWh. The aluminium alloy carbodies reduced the tare mass of the cars by 2 tonnes, and featured thyristorized voltage regulation and excitation, which greatly increased the speed and acceleration of the trains. In addition to this, the new train implemented forced ventilation (removing the humps of the roof that were for ventilation of the passenger area), new lightning in the passenger area, and removal of cabs on the trailer cars, leaving only 1 cab at the each end of the train.

This greatly increased the passenger capacity and performance. But despite its advantages, it posed disadvantages to its manufacturers: it was too complex to be mass-produced, in such a short time. The factories that were to produce the cars could not set up aluminium manufacturing facilities in such a short time, and additionally, the voltage regulation system and thyristors required refinement. The type 1 prototype of the I-series was eventually made, but the production of the Ež3/Em508T subseries continued, also due to lower costs of manufacture.

The base model
By the early 1970s, the Metrovagonmash factory already designed a trailer car type, based on the never-built Ež2 subseries. The control cars were also based on the Ež2, but the front end was modified, along with the drivers controls. These two types of cars later became 81-714 and 81-717, respectively. With more lessons learnt from the electrical propulsion system of the I-series, in the first half of 1976, the Mytishchi factories made the first cars of the 81-series. These were 5846, 5854, 5855 (control cars) and 5837, 5867, 5868 (trailer cars).

The design of the new cars was similar, but at the same time, different from the newest E-series cars. The carbodies were roughly similar to them, having same dimensions. Certain equipment (doors, motor-compressors, batteries, other pneumatic equipment) were also carried over from the Ež3 subseries. However the most noticeable external change was in the front ends of the train: the driver car was moved in the middle of the train, no longer being placed on the right side of the train. Additionally, the emergency exit doors were removed, because of this. Traction motors from the I-series, the DK-117B, now producing 110 kWh, were installed. Compared to the older trains an Auxiliary Power Supply Unit (Блок Питания Собственных Нужд) was installed to power the batteries. Lightning in the passenger area was now made with fluorescent lamps. This led to an increase in the tare weight of the cars, so it was decided to use a springs-based suspension.

The 81-series cars never got a lettered classification, because these were an experimental alternative to the complex I-series cars. But the complexity of the I-series cars, which meant endless adjustments regarding aluminium production, pulse regulation, at the time when newly opened Soviet metro networks (such as in Tashkent, Kharkiv, etc.) were in dire need of new cars, led to the selection of the 81-series to become the new standard metro trainset of the Soviet Union. The production of prototypes of the I-series continued in the 1980s, but they were the last to receive a lettered classification, which meant that metro sets produced from the 81-717/714 onwards never received a lettered classification. With the appearance of newer sets (such as the Yauza, Rusich, Oka, Neva, Moskva), the 81-series then became known as the "Numbered Train" (Номерной Поезд; Nomernoy Poezd). It should also be noted that "nomernoy" also stands for vehicle registration plates, so this can be a widely interpreted name in the English language.

The demand for the cars was very high at the beginning, so high, that production at the I. E. Yegorov factory in Leningrad (now known as Vagonmash Saint Petersburg) began in January 1980, later on, the Tver (then known as Kalinin) Railcar Factory began production of these cars in mid-1980 of 81-717 cars, and in 1985 of 81-714 cars.

Operation
Since its start of production, the sets were delivered to all metro networks in the Soviet Union, and also to most of the Warsaw Pact countries.

Within the USSR

Moscow
Moscow was the first customer of the 81-717/714 train in the Soviet Union, where it initially tested the prototypes between 1976 and 1977. By late 1977 it had placed its order for the new train, and the first trains arrived in 1978 on the Koltsevaya line, replacing the G-series metro trains that had operating since the opening of the line in 1950. This was followed with the newly opened Kalininskaya line and the Zamoskvoretskaya line in 1979. Since then they have become representative of the network, being used on almost all lines (except the ones that kept using E-series trainsets and that were replaced with Rusich, Oka and Moskva trainsets).

Beginning with 1993, the Moscow Metro began purchasing 81-717.5M/714.5M sets, after in 1988 the production of the base model ended, leaving a five-year break in purchases of new cars (during this time, the ill-fated Yauza trains were in planning stage). Deliveries further continued between 1997 and 2010.

Over the years, the 81-717/714 sets received improvements, especially from the late 1990s onwards, replacing the traditional leather bench-type seats with vandal-proof plastic ones. Externally, the difference between the base model and newer sets is the presence of four headlights in the centre instead of two headlights above the drivers' cab.

Some of the 81-717/714 sets have special liveries, most notably the "Red Arrow" train, which is painted in a red/gold livery instead of the traditional blue/white scheme. More recently, refurbished sets feature the new Moscow Metro livery, with blue corrugated sides and grey window bands. Another special example is the 81-717.5A/714.5A set, used exclusively on the Sokolnicheskaya line. It was based on the A-series sets of the Moscow metro, following an old-school theme: the exterior is similar to the A-series sets in a cream/chocolate livery, whilst the interior is based on 1950s carriages.

Their current allocation is:
TMD-1 Severnoye (Sokolnicheskaya line)
TMD-2 Sokol (Zamoskvoretskaya line)
TMD-5 Kaluzhskoye (Kaluzhsko-Rizhskaya line)
TMD-15 Pechatniki (Lyublinsko-Dimitrovskaya line)
TMD-17 Brateyevo (Zamoskvoretskaya line)
TMD-19 Likhobory (Lyublinsko-Dimitrovskaya line)

It is expected that at some point, the trains will be withdrawn due to the incoming "Moskva" trainsets, which have been introduced gradually since 2017 on multiple lines where the 81-717/714s are operating.

Saint Petersburg (formerly Leningrad)
In service on Line 2 (Moskovsko-Petrogradskaya Line), Line 4 (Pravoberezhnaya Line)
and Line 5 (Frunzensko-Primorskaya Line) since the 1980s.

Tashkent
The trains were delivered to Tashkent from 1980 to 1993 in order to replace the Ezh3/Em-508T cars on Chilonzor line and enter service on the Uzbekiston line. There are 168 carriages operational today on the metro.

Tbilisi
81-717/714 trains are serving both the Akhmeteli-Varketili Line (On this line there are some Ež3 and Em-508T modernized cars) and the Saburtalo Line in Tbilisi metro. All trains were refurbished and are now running as 81-717M/714M. 81-717M trains were modernized using Czech blueprints, hence the similar cab and livery designs. These run at 825V.

Outside the USSR
Outside the USSR, the trainsets were delivered initially to Prague and Budapest, and later on to Warsaw and Sofia. As such, they are all .

Budapest
Cars of type 81-717.2/714.2 were delivered to Hungary between 1979 and 1990, where they have been in service on lines M2 and M3. In 2015 a contract was signed on the modernization of the existing older subway cars on the metro. In 2016 the first subway train left Budapest and was delivered back to Metrovagonmash in Russia to be overhauled into type 81-717.2K/714.2K. The first train reentered service in March 2017, with the original DC motors replaced by Japanese Hitachi VVVF traction systems and motors. The remaining trains were delivered by August 2018. The units on line 2 were replaced by modern Alstom Metropolis vehicles.

Prague
507 carriages (204 motor cars and 303 trailers) of type 81-717.1/714.1 were delivered to Prague between 1978 and 1990, the aim being to run 101 five-car sets with two motors kept as spares. Full overhauls had been scheduled for the oldest cars in the early 1990s, but it was eventually decided that a more complete rebuild was required, and between 1994 and 2010 most but not all of the 81-71 cars were rebuilt as 81-71M stock by Škoda and ČKD.

Sofia
Metro cars of type 81-717.4/714.4 were delivered to Bulgaria in 1990 some eight years prior to the opening of the capital's metro. The trains are all formed of four carriages, but in 2005 and 2013 the Bulgarian metro system has been receiving trains of type 81-740.2/741.2 or 81-740.2B/741.2B, and currently there are only 12 four-car trainsets of type 81-717.4/714.4 and 40 three-car trainsets of type 81-740.2/741.2. A contract was signed in 2018 for modernization of the existing 81-717.4/714.4 cars; the first refurbished trains were delivered in 2020. The refurbished trains look very similar to type 81-717.2k/714.2k on Budapest metro line M3.

Warsaw
Subway cars of type 81-717.3/714.3 were delivered to Poland between 1989 and 1995. The train sets are formed of six cars. By 1994, the metro had received metro cars of type 81-572/573. Additional Russian-built cars of type 81-572.2/573.2 were also delivered between 2007 and 2009. In 2020 a contract was signed on replacing these trains with newer ones built by Skoda in Czech Republic. The first Skoda train arrived to Warsaw in April 2022 and after quality testing these trains will enter service and will gradually replace the older trains.

Technical
The 81-717/714 cars in the former Soviet Union operate on metro networks with 1520+4 mm track gauges. The Sofia, Budapest, Warsaw and Prague metro networks use standard gauge (1435 mm) and receive power from the 3rd rail via a bottom-contact shoe, except in Budapest, which uses top-contact shoes. The trains usually have a flexible formation, of 2 control cars at each end, and a variable number of trailer cars in the middle. Thus, a train can have only 1 car in the middle, or up to 6, making 3 to 8 car formations. However, a notable exception is on the Yerevan metro, where trains there can operate even with no trailer cars. In addition to this, the 81-717M type has 2 cabs at both ends, as opposed to 1 cab at opposing ends, also used in Yerevan.

Interior fittings

Like all metro trains of the former Soviet Union, the 81-717/714 trains feature longitudinal bench seating, which is placed to the walls of the cars between the doors and an empty central aisle. The passenger area is ventilated with the help of air vents on the roof of the car, along with small sliding windows.

Originally, bench seats with hard leather trim were fitted on these cars, but they were subject to vandalism in the 1990s and 2000s. Due to this, refurbished and later models feature vandal-proof seating with a plastic base and leatherette linings, separate for each passenger. Sometimes, metal partitions can be added too. Overall, the bench seats can accommodate as many as 6 people (or 3 at the end sections), which means that seating space in all cars varies from 40 to 48, while seated.

While there are access doors between each car, passing from one car to the other while the train is moving is very dangerous, and due to this only staff permits such tasks usually. The doors can be used in an emergency, but they are sometimes used by zatsepers (Russian trainsurfers) to climb on the roof of the train on over-ground sections.

Replacement 
As the wear and aging of these trains began to be replaced with newer ones, but in different subways this happened differently , in the Moscow metro as a replacement first were the trains Rusich, later Oka and Moscow . In Saint Petersburg, 81-556 Neva trains are used as replacements, while in Novosibirsk, several of these trains are replaced with 81-540 trains, which are a further development of the 81-717 . In Minsk, the 81-717 train started to run on new Stadler cars manufactured in the Fanipol suburb of Minsk. In Baku, as well as in Moscow, 81-765 trains will be used to replace the 81-740 cars, but these trains will be called Baku.

References

External links
 

Electric multiple units of Russia
Electric multiple units of Ukraine
Electric multiple units of Belarus
Rolling stock of Bulgaria
Rolling stock of Hungary
Electric multiple units of Poland
Electric multiple units of the Czech Republic